Menissa Rambally  (born 1976) is a Saint Lucian politician who represented the Castries South East constituency for the Saint Lucia Labour Party, until she was defeated in the general election of 11 December 2006. She was appointed Permanent Representative for Saint Lucia to the United Nations in 2012.

She was the Minister of Culture in the government of the Saint Lucia Labour Party. Rambally was the youngest candidate and the youngest MP in the country's history, entering parliament at 21 years of age.  She is of Indian, African and European ancestry. She is a graduate of the Leon Hess Comprehensive School and a Business Graduate of Caribbean Union College, an affiliate of Andrews University, Michigan.

Menissa is the eldest daughter of Nelista and Hezekiah Rambally, with her sisters Pearl and Shameela. Shameela, meanwhile, is determined to blaze her own trail in the business sector. Menissa entered politics due to the untimely death of her father who had been selected as the St Lucia Labour Party candidate for the Castries Southeast constituency. Upon entering the race, she quickly became a favorite to gain a seat for the opposition.

As the results came in, it became apparent that she would not only win her seat but would do so decisively. She would remain in power until the next election cycle which she won handily. The election of Rambally and Sarah Flood Beaubrun in 1997 and 2001, according to Cynthia Barrow-Giles, "transformed the St Lucia lower House of parliament from a virtual 'all boys camp' to a more gender integrated elected parliament". Rambally served in the Ministry of Agriculture as permanent secretary, minister of tourism, and, most recently, minister of social transformation.

After her loss to Guy Joseph, she began enhancing her career as a political consultant and at the same time furthering her education. She believes in young people and have promised to help them as much as she could. Her favorite quote to young people is "knowing young people like you is what makes public life so fulfilling."

References

1976 births
Living people
Members of the House of Assembly of Saint Lucia
Government ministers of Saint Lucia
Permanent Representatives of Saint Lucia to the United Nations
Saint Lucia Labour Party politicians
Women government ministers of Saint Lucia
Saint Lucian women diplomats
Women ambassadors
20th-century Saint Lucian women politicians
21st-century Saint Lucian women politicians
21st-century Saint Lucian politicians
University of the Southern Caribbean alumni